Anthony Island is a Canadian island and former fishing settlement in Trinity Bay in the province of Newfoundland and Labrador.

See also 
List of ghost towns in Newfoundland and Labrador

Ghost towns in Newfoundland and Labrador